Pudhu Vazhvu is a 1957 Indian Tamil-language film produced and directed by M. K. Thyagaraja Bhagavathar. The film stars himself, Lalitha and Madhuri Devi. It was released on 8 March 1957.

Plot 

Vaikuntam is a lad who lives in a village. He is a good singer and in love with a lass Nagammal. But Nagammal's brother is against their love. One day he ties Vaikundam to a tree. Vaikundam was rescued by a rich woman who was passing that way. She takes Vaikundam to her city. When she realises that Vaikundam is talented in singing, she promotes him as a singer. She renames him as Geethamani. He becomes famous and rich. He neglects his parents and ill treats them. His lover Nagammal tries to kill herself because of his behaviour. How Geethamani realises his delusion and reconciles with his parents and Nagammal forms the rest of the story.

Cast 
Adapted from The Hindu article and the opening credits

Male cast
 M. K. Thyagaraja Bhagavathar as Vaikuntam, Geethamani
 N. S. Krishnan as Nallathambi
 T. S. Balaiah as Neelakantan
 T. S. Durairaj as Raman
 K. A. Thangavelu as Thangavelu
 Alwar Kuppusami as Santhanam
 P. B. Rangachari as Vaikuntam's father
 Yadhartham Ponnusami Pillai as Yadhartham
 V. K. Achari as Sahadevan
 V. R. Rajagopal as Thambi
 Rajagopal as Thangavelu's worker

Female cast
 Madhuri Devi as Subha
 Lalitha as Nagamma
 T. A. Mathuram as Muthunagai
 Kumari Thulasi as Mahima
 Ambika as Dancer
 K. N. Kamalam as Chellam
 T. V. Kalyani as Vaikundam's mother

Soundtrack 
Music was composed by G. Ramanathan and C. N. Pandurangan, while the lyrics were penned by Papanasam Sivan, Thanjai N. Ramaiah Dass, A. Maruthakasi, Natarajasundaram, Saravanabhavananda and Suratha.

Release and reception 
Pudhu Vazhvu was released in select theatres on 8 March 1957, and in others on 22 March. Film historian Randor Guy wrote in 2014 that the film was a flop at the box office but the songs are still worth listening even after more than half a century.

References

External links 

1950s Tamil-language films
Films scored by G. Ramanathan
Films scored by C. N. Pandurangan